Hexaplex duplex is a species of sea snail, a marine gastropod mollusk in the family Muricidae, the murex snails or rock snails.

Subspecies
Both subspecies are now considered synonyms of Hexaplex duplex.
Hexaplex duplex duplex (Röding, 1798) – synonyms: Murex eurystomus Swainson, 1833; Murex hoplites Fischer, 1876; Murex minima Dautzenberg, 1910; Murex saxatilis Linnaeus (auctt.); Purpura duplex Röding, 1798
Hexaplex duplex canariensis (Nordsieck, 1975) – synonyms: Murex turbinatus Lamarck, 1822; Trunculariopsis canariensis Nordsieck, 1975

Description
It contains six to eight varices. These are singly spinous, the spines somewhat frondose, those on the shoulder of the whorls usually larger and curved. There are no interstitial ribs. The color of the shell is light yellowish brown, usually more or less pink-banded. The aperture is pink, with three or four darker bands.

Distribution
This species occurs in the Red Sea and in the Atlantic Ocean off the Cape Verdes and the Canary Islands; and from Senegal to Angola. It has also been described as Murex turbinatus from the Mediterranean Sea.

References

 Fischer, P., 1876. - Description d'espèces nouvelles d'Afrique occidentale. Journal de Conchyliologie 24: 236-240
 Merle D., Garrigues B. & Pointier J.-P. (2011) Fossil and Recent Muricidae of the world. Part Muricinae. Hackenheim: Conchbooks. 648 pp.

External links
 Lamarck [J.-B. M.] de (1815–1822). Histoire naturelle des animaux sans vertèbres. Paris: 7 volumes. Vol. 1 [Introduction]: Verdière, i–xvi, 1–462 [March 1815]; Vol. 2 [les Polypes, les Radiaires]: Verdière, 1–568 [March 1816]; Vol. 3 [suite des Radiaires; les Tuniciers; les Vers]: Verdière, 1–586 [August, 1816]; Vol. 4: Deterville/Verdière, 1–603 [April 1817]; Vol. 5 [les Arachnides; les Crustacés; les Annélides; les Cirrhipèdes; les Conchiferes]: Paris, Deterville/Verdière, 1–612 [25 July 1818]; Vol. 6(1) [suite des Conchifères; Les Mollusques]: published by the Author, i–vi, 1–343 [June 1819]; Vol. 6(2) (suite): published by the Author, 1–232 [April 1822]; Vol. 7 (suite): published by the Author, 1–711. [August 1822]

External links

Muricidae
Gastropods described in 1798
Molluscs of the Atlantic Ocean
Molluscs of the Mediterranean Sea
Molluscs of Angola
Molluscs of the Canary Islands
Gastropods of Cape Verde
Invertebrates of West Africa
Fauna of the Red Sea